Patent analysis is the process of analyzing patent documents and other information from the patent lifecycle (patent information). The field of patent analytics uses patent analysis to obtain deeper insights into different technologies and innovation. Other terms are sometimes used as synonyms for patent analytics: patent landscaping, patent mapping, or cartography. However, there is no harmonized terminology in different languages, including in French and Spanish, while in some languages such as Russian terms are borrowed from other languages (e.g. the German term “Patentlandschaften” in Russian). Patent analytics encompasses the analysis of patent data, analysis of the scientific literature, data cleaning, text mining, machine learning, geographic mapping, and data visualisation.

Patent analytics is used in industry and increasingly explored by the public sector to take informed decisions related to prioritization and investments in R&D, IP portfolio management, commercialization of technology, and research collaborations among others.

Patent analysis tools and methods have traditionally been done using spreadsheet-based data analysis methods. More recently, the field of intellectual property has witnessed a convergence of traditional patent analytics with data science, machine learning, semantic technologies, and artificial intelligence along with a surge in available tools that are being applied to patent visualization. There has also been an increase in open-source software and tools being used for patent analytics, as well as the use of techniques, such as machine learning, for different tasks. Some tools propose semi-automated production of visualizations, dashboards or reports.

Types of patent analysis and reports 
Different types of patent analyses can be performed based on the need and the questions to be answered and each type of analysis leads to different associated reports. A patentability or prior art search report provides information on whether a new invention is eligible for patent protection, along with information on what are the closest prior arts. This analysis helps patent attorneys draft broad and appropriate claims for the new invention. The patentability search includes both patent and non-patent literature. A freedom-to-operate search report helps organizations decide if they have the clearance to launch a new product without infringing on anyone else’s patent rights. This is specific to only one jurisdiction, and multiple searches for each jurisdiction have to be performed if an organization is interested in obtaining clearance for product launch in different countries.

Patent landscape reports 
Patent landscape reports (PLRs) are another example of a report produced by performing patent analysis. 

For users in industry, they are used as a decision-making mechanism (patent portfolio management, R&D investment and prioritisation, technology transfer, etc.). Such reports are typically confidential and not publicly available. They are costly and commissioned or developed to support specific decision-making processes and are considered business intelligence. 

In the public sector, the providers of patent landscape reports are the national patent offices or research institutes that prepare reports on subjects of general interest, for a specific need, or to provide landscaping services to the public. Patent landscape reports are used by the public sector to raise awareness, with public institutions increasingly finding ways to facilitate and validate their policy decisions in ways that are similar to private sector decisions.

Some public and private entities make patent landscape reports or patent analytics reports publicly available, including patent offices. An example of a searchable database of such reports is World Intellectual Property Organization's PATENTSCOPE database that facilitates Patent Landscape Reports by Other Organizations. One or several state of the art or prior art patent search reports form the basis of these patent landscape reports. Different fields of patent documents and other structured information are analyzed using statistical, analytical, and comparative methods to identify patterns, understand IP strategies and trends in technology areas in question. The results of the analysis are presented using a combination of narrative and different type of visualizations.

Patent landscape reports are sometimes confused with different products serving different purposes, such as a freedom-to-operate (FTO) analysis which has a different scope and is based on an FTO search; technology bulletins, technology watches/technology alerts, or even specific type of visualizations.

Patent analysis methodology 
There are currently very few methodological resources describing the steps and tasks involved in patent analytics. Typically patent analytics teams work with R&D departments, patent attorneys, with related information feeding into IP, corporate and business strategy decisions.  

In general, patent analytics and patent landscape report creation involves the following stages: 

 Defining the topic and project scope,  
 The patent search that leads to obtaining patent data, 
 Data cleaning and normalization, 
 Data analysis and visualization, 
 Narrative and storytelling when drafting the report, and
 Dissemination and distribution of the analysis.

Patent analytics is an iterative process which often requires rescoping of the project and adaptation based on the findings during the process. There are different tools which can be used for analytics, some embedded in patent databases, others more general data manipulation, visualization and analytics tools, including commercial and open source tools.

See also 
 Patent
 Prior art
 Search reports
 Intellectual property
 Data analysis

Further reading

References

External links 
 Patentscope Database maintained by World Intellectual Property Organization
 Patent landscape reports generated by WIPO
 Patent Landscape Report searchable database
Lens public database of patent analysis-specific tools

Intellectual property law
Legal software
Patent law